Dying is a 2017 Spanish drama film directed by Fernando Franco which stars Marian Álvarez and Andrés Gertrúdix.

Plot 
The plot concerns about the deterioration of Marta and Luis' life as a couple upon the development of a terminal illness by Luis.

Cast

Production 
Penned by Fernando Franco and Coral Cruz, the screenplay of Dying is a free adaptation of the 1895 work of the same name by Arthur Schnitzler. The film is a Kowalski Films and Ferdydurke Films production, in association with Film Factory Entertainment. It was shot in the Basque Country, Cantabria, Madrid and Seville.

Release 
The film premiered at the 65th San Sebastián International Film Festival on 27 September 2017, selected as an official selection's 'Special Screening'. Distributed by Golem Distribución, it was theatrically released in Spain on 6 October 2017.

Reception 
Jordi Costa of Fotogramas rated the film 4 out of 5 stars, assessing that while Gertrúdix is superb, "the film IS Marian Álvarez, gigantic, [with her character] wasting away before the consumed body of her loved one."

Alberto Bermejo of El Mundo rated the film 4 out of 5 stars, describing it, above all, as "an intimate chronicle, almost interior, of overflowing authenticity, of truth sustained by the two main characters", praising the outstanding work from the two protagonists while warning it is not a film suitable for everyone.

Accolades 

|-
| rowspan = "8" align = "center" | 2018 || rowspan = "2" | 23rd Forqué Awards || Best Actress || Marian Álvarez ||  || rowspan = "2" | 
|-
| Best Actor || Andrés Gertrúdix || 
|-
| rowspan = "2" | 5th Feroz Awards || Best Actress || Marian Álvarez ||  || rowspan = "2" | 
|-
| Best Actor || Andrés Gertrúdix || 
|-
| 32nd Goya Awards || Best Actor || Andrés Gertrúdix ||  || align = "center" | 
|}

See also 
 List of Spanish films of 2017

References 

Films shot in the Basque Country (autonomous community)
Films shot in Cantabria
Films shot in Madrid
Films shot in the province of Seville
2010s Spanish-language films
2017 romantic drama films
Spanish romantic drama films
Films based on works by Arthur Schnitzler
Kowalski Films films
2010s Spanish films